Tribal Thunder is an album by surf guitarist Dick Dale, released in 1993. It was his first album of new material in almost three decades.

Track listing 
All tracks composed by Dick Dale; except where indicated
"Nitro" – 3:19
"The New Victor" – 2:48
"Esperanza" – 3:52
"Shredded Heat" – 2:45
"Trail of Tears" – 4:52
"Caravan" (Duke Ellington, Juan Tizol)– 4:47
"The Eliminator" – 2:25
"Speardance" – 5:37
"Hot Links: Caterpillar Crawl/Rumble" (Joel Scott Hill, Ron Lynch/Link Wray, Mark Grant)– 5:59
"The Long Ride" – 3:57
"Tribal Thunder" – 6:21
"Misirlou" (acoustic version, unlabeled on CD) – 2:29

Personnel 
 Dick Dale - guitar, vocals
 Ron Eglit - bass guitar on "Nitro", "Esperanza", "Trail of Tears", "Caravan", "Speardance", "Hot Links" and "The Long Ride"
 Rowland Salley - bass guitar on "The New Victor", "Shredded Heat", "The Eliminator" and "Tribal Thunder"
 Scott Mathews - drums, percussion
 Prairie Prince - drums, percussion
 The Tribe (Scott, Prairie, Kolleen, Dick, Jill and Forrest) - chants

References

1993 albums
Dick Dale albums
HighTone Records albums